Visconte may refer to:

Viscount
Half Visconte, American indie rock group
Rocky Visconte (born 1990), Australian soccer player
Visconte Maggiolo (1478–1530), Italian cartographer and sailor